Serine/threonine-protein phosphatase 4 catalytic subunit is an enzyme that in humans is encoded by the PPP4C gene.

Interactions 

PPP4C has been shown to interact with:

 CCDC6, 
 CCT2, 
 CCT3, 
 CCT4, 
 CCT5, 
 CCT6A, 
 CCT7, 
 IGBP1, 
 PPP2R1A,
 PPP4R1, 
 REL, 
 SMEK2, 
 T-complex 1,  and
 TRAF6.

References

Further reading